Anthony Chau Tin-hang is the current acting deputy director of public prosecutions in Hong Kong.

Cases

Jimmy Lai trial 
On Christmas Eve in December 2020, Chau filed an urgent appeal with the Court of Final Appeal and argued that Jimmy Lai should be denied bail and sent back to jail, saying that the threshold for bail in cases around the National Security Law should be high. Chau also argued that people who can commit future offenses without special conditions should not be eligible for release. Additionally, Chau said that he would be willing to fight a court battle over the issue, including on public holidays.

Chau also argued that Lai gave media interviews which "proved" collusion with foreign forces. In response, the judge disagreed and said that "The statements in question on their face appear to be comments and criticisms rather than requests, albeit one might find those views disagreeable or even offensive."

In September 2022, Chau said that he would try his best to include evidence found on Lai's cellphone, and asked Lai's defence team to "not complain about the last-minute filing" of the evidence.

In November 2022, Chau filed an application to delay Lai's trial until after the NPCSC decides on blocking the hiring of foreign lawyers such as Tim Owen in national security cases. Chau claimed to the court that the NPCSC may also ban foreign lawyers from giving advice to clients. Chau also said the prosecution may further delay the trial if the NPCSC does not rule on the issue before the start of the trial, with one of the judges saying that it would be unfair to Lai if Chau keeps delaying the trial.

On 13 December 2022, Chau filed another application to delay the case until 3 January 2023, until after the NPCSC is expected to rule in the matter.

Apple Daily and Next Digital 
In November 2022, 6 senior staff members of Apple Daily and Next Digital pleaded guilty to taking part in national security offenses. Chau argued that Apple Daily was used to advocate for foreign sanctions on Hong Kong, and said "The impugned content took the form of, among others, articles purported to be news coverage of current issues, commentary articles, and appeals or propaganda directly and unlawfully advocating political agenda."

Yuen Long attack 
Chau is also the lead prosecutor for the 2019 Yuen Long attack. In February 2021, judge Eddie Yip expressed frustration with Chau, who repeatedly complained that Chau glossed over important details, such as who started the attack; Chau eventually admitted that those in white were the ones who started the attack. The judge also complained that Chau's timeline of events felt like an "edited film" and was confusing. Chau also described the incident as a "physical collision," to which the judge remarked "What does 'physical collision' mean? Playing bumper cars?"

In addition, when Yip requested the name and title of the officer responsible for the incident from Chau, Chau told Yip that he would submit it in writing. In response, Yip requested that Chau directly inform him and said "because it’s an open trial, we don't pass notes."

Chan Tze-wah 
Chau also represents the prosecution for a case against Chan Tze-wah, who has been accused by the government of conspiring to collude with foreign forces. Chan is charged with having assisted Andy Li attempt to flee from Hong Kong to Taiwan by boat.

Tong Ying-kit 
Tong Ying-kit is the first person charged under the National Security Law. On 1 July 2020, he was accused of driving his motorcycle into police while flying a flag that stated "Liberate Hong Kong, Revolution of Our Times". Chau represents the prosecution, and argued that Tong drove his motorcycle past four police checkpoints despite multiple warnings not to do so, which amounted to Tong committing "terrorism".

In July 2021, Chau asked defence expert Professor Francis Lee from Chinese University whether his research into the "Liberate Hong Kong, Revolution of Our Times" slogan was reliable, asking if his focus group participants were really telling the truth or lying. Chau also said that Lee's research was "unreliable and irrelevant". Chau called on a historian, Lau Chi-pang, who claimed to the court that the slogan meant overthrowing the regime.

Chau also argued that Tong's flag would have posed a "serious threat" to road safety if it had detached from his motorcycle.

In April 2021, the judges suggested that Chau's interpretation of "terrorism" was too narrow, and that Chau's actions did not necessarily cause or intend harm on a broad level against society.

Koo Sze-yiu 
In the case against Koo Sze-yiu, Chau argued that the Chinese Communist Party is the "constitutional foundation" to the Basic Law, and also argued that freedom of speech is not absolute.

612 Humanitarian Relief Fund 
Chau also argued that the 612 Humanitarian Relief Fund, with members such as Cardinal Joseph Zen, should have registered as a society, and that doing so would not infringe on freedom of association. In addition, Chau argued that the Societies Ordinance was enacted to safeguard national security.

Hong Kong 47 

In February 2023, Chau argued of pan-democrats who were trying to win seats in the Legislative Council that "the conspiracy would have been carried out to fruition and the provision of public services essential to the operation and stability of the HKSAR and the livelihoods of the people of the HKSAR would have been gravely affected."

Views

Bail 
In February 2021, Chau told the Court of Final Appeal that the default position the government should hold is that those suspected of breaking the national security law should not be granted bail. The prosecution team also argued that those suspected of breaking the national security law should be denied bail, similar to the way murderers are.

Deterrent 
Chau also argued that cases under the national security law must have a deterrent effect.

Minimum sentencing 
In October 2022, Chau asked for an additional week for the case against Lui Sai-yu to research on whether the national security law prescribes a mandatory minimum jail sentence, while Lui's lawyer argued that it was only a suggested length of time.

Sanctions 
In July 2022, the United States' Congressional-Executive Commission on China recommended that Chau be sanctioned by the US government for his work in prosecuting people under the national security law.

References 

Living people
Year of birth missing (living people)